Descend into Depravity is the sixth studio album by American death metal band Dying Fetus. It was released in the United States on September 15, 2009, and worldwide on September 21, 2009. The album's release date and title had been announced on June 4, and the cover and track listing were revealed on July 15.

Only three band members appear on this album. With the dismissal of Duane Timlin in 2007, Trey Williams took his place as drummer. John Gallagher and Sean Beasley were left to write the lyrics and songs alone as Mike Kimball had also left.

Track listing

Credits 
Writing, performance and production credits are adapted from the album liner notes.

Personnel

Dying Fetus 
 John Gallagher – guitar, vocals
 Sean Beasley – bass, vocals
 Trey Williams – drums

Production 
 Steve Wright – production, recording, mixing, mastering
 Dying Fetus – production
 Drew Lamond – additional engineering

Artwork and design 
 Orion Landau – art direction, design
 Scott Kinkade – photography
 Josh Sisk – photography

Charts

References

External links 
 

2009 albums
Dying Fetus albums
Relapse Records albums